The 1991 Amstel Gold Race was the 26th edition of the annual road bicycle race "Amstel Gold Race", held on Saturday April 27, 1991, in the Dutch province of Limburg. The race stretched 244 kilometres, with the start in Heerlen and the finish in Maastricht. There were a total of 185 competitors, with 123 cyclists finishing the race.

Result

External links
Results

Amstel Gold Race
April 1991 sports events in Europe
1991 in road cycling
1991 in Dutch sport
1991 UCI Road World Cup